Granma is the official newspaper of the Central Committee of the Communist Party of Cuba. Publication of the newspaper began in February of 1966. Its name comes from the yacht Granma that carried Fidel Castro and 81 other rebels to Cuba's shores in 1956, launching the Cuban Revolution. The newspaper has been a way for the Cuban Communist Party to communicate their ideology to the world, especially in regards to the United States. Marta Rojas worked for the paper since its founding.

Editions
The newspaper is published daily and is the most widely read newspaper in Cuba. In 1997, the circulation of the newspaper was estimated to be approximately 675,000. Several weekly international editions, available in English, Spanish, French, German, Italian,  Turkish and Portuguese, are also distributed abroad. Apart from Cuba, Granma is also printed in Argentina, Brazil, and Canada. Also, news stories from Granma are often carried later in the Spanish-language sections of periodicals with a similar political base, such as People's Weekly World.

The normal edition is published six days a week (not Sundays) and runs to eight pages plus occasional supplements.

Digital Format 
The first website for Granma was created in August of 1996, making Granma the first media organization in Cuba to have a website. The Granma daily news was first published on a separate website in July 1997, and the two sites were later merged. The website includes versions of the newspaper in five languages other than Spanish, and updates all of these versions daily.

Content 
Granma regularly features:
 Speeches by Raúl Castro and other leaders of the Cuban government, including former President Fidel Castro's column, 'Reflexiones de Fidel' meaning 'Fidel's Reflections'.
 Official announcements of the Cuban government
 Popular sketches highlighting the history of Cuba's revolutionary struggle, from the 19th to the 21st century
 Developments in Latin America and world politics
 Steps by Cuba's workers and farmers to defend and advance the socialist revolution
 Developments in industry, agriculture, science, the arts, and sports in Cuba today
 TV listings for that day
 Cuban social, cultural, and political events, such as parades and festivals

The Newspaper has tended to focus on events occurring in and around Havana. In regards to political events, it has tended to focus on events supportive of the party and government, while excluding events that do not support these institutions. Recently this has started to change, which coincides with the Cuban Communist Party's policy of being more open to criticism.

Cartas a la Dirección 
The Cartas a la Dirección section of Granma contains letters from readers, as well as responses from the editor. It was first included in the newspaper on March 14, 2008, soon after Raúl Castro's speech stating that the Cuban Communist Party is open to criticism. The section has since then become very popular. The letters in this section can involve multiple topics, including complaints and suggestions for the newspaper or the Cuban Communist Party. Publication of letters to the editor of Granma serve a few functions. First, the publication of the letters acts as a platform in which the Cuban public can directly interact with the editor of the newspaper, as well as with the communist party as a whole. It also serves as a method for the party and the government to stay accountable to the public. Finally, the letters help inform Cuban leadership of matters concerning the people. Initially, very few of the letters published in Cartas a la Dirección received responses, and these responses were often vague and unhelpful. However, Granma, through editorial comments added onto letters and responses, as well as a periodic overview of responses, attempted to pressure government agencies into improving the quality and frequency of their responses. The strategy worked, with 77 percent of letters receiving responses in 2016, improved from only 8.8 percent in 2011.

The section Cartas a la Dirección is not the first time Granma has included letters from readers in the newspaper, but most of these sections were more focused on a certain topic, such as economic statistics or transportation and infrastructure. An exception was A vuelta de correo, which began in 1975 and continued until 1984. Like Cartas a la Dirección, A vuelta de correo included questions from the Cuban public that brought attention to various issues, as well as occasional responses by the government. However, these letters were much less specific than those found in Cartas a la Dirección, and were frequently redacted.

Editors
 1965-1967 Isidoro Malmierca
 1967-1987 Jorge Enrique Mendoza
 1987-1990 Enrique Román
 1990-1995 Jacinto Granda
 1995-2005 Frank Agüero
 2005-2013 Lázaro Barredo
 2013–present Pelayo Terry

In 2012, Mairelys Cuevas Gómez, the editor-in-chief of Granma, fled to Miami after seeking asylum in the US.

References

External links 

 Official website in English 
 Official website in Spanish 
 Official website in German 
 Official website in French 
 Official website in Portuguese 
 Official website in Italian 
 Pathfinder Press: Granma subscriptions
  ("Searchable Spanish-language database of articles published from 1965 to 1992" in Granma)

Newspapers published in Cuba
Publications established in 1965
Communism in Cuba
Communist newspapers
Spanish-language communist newspapers
Propaganda organizations
Communist Party of Cuba
1965 establishments in Cuba